Babi Yar or Babyn Yar is a ravine in the Ukrainian capital Kyiv and a site of massacres carried out by Nazi Germany's forces during its campaign against the Soviet Union in World War II. The first and best documented of the massacres took place on 29–30 September 1941, killing some 33,771 Jews. The decision to murder all the Jews in Kyiv was made by the military governor Generalmajor Kurt Eberhard, the Police Commander for Army Group South, SS-Obergruppenführer Friedrich Jeckeln, and the Einsatzgruppe C Commander Otto Rasch. Sonderkommando 4a as the sub-unit of Einsatzgruppe C, along with the aid of the SD and Order Police battalions with the Ukrainian Auxiliary Police backed by the Wehrmacht, carried out the orders. Sonderkommando 4a and the 45th Battalion of the German Order Police conducted the shootings. Servicemen of the 303rd Battalion of the German Order Police at this time guarded the outer perimeter of the execution site.

The massacre was the largest mass-murder by the Nazi regime during the campaign against the Soviet Union, and it has been called "the largest single massacre in the history of the Holocaust" to that particular date. It is only surpassed overall by the later October 1941 Odessa massacre of more than 50,000 Jews (committed by German and Romanian troops), and by Aktion Erntefest of November 1943 in occupied Poland with 42,000–43,000 victims.

Other victims of massacres at the site included Soviet prisoners of war, communists and Roma. It is estimated that between 100,000 and 150,000 people were murdered at Babi Yar during the German occupation.

Historical background
The Babi Yar (Babyn Yar) ravine was first mentioned in historical accounts in 1401, in connection to the sale of it by "baba" (an old woman) who was also the cantiniere in the Dominican Monastery. The word "yar" is Turkic in origin and means "gully" or "ravine". Over several centuries, the site was used for various purposes, including military camps and at least two cemeteries, including an Orthodox Christian cemetery and a Jewish cemetery. The latter was officially closed in 1937.

Massacres of September 1941
Axis forces, mainly German, occupied Kyiv on 19 September 1941. Between 20 and 28 September, explosives planted by the Soviet secret police (the NKVD) caused extensive damage in the city, and on 24 September an explosion rocked Rear Headquarters Army Group South. Two days later, on 26 September, Maj. Gen. Kurt Eberhard, the military governor, and SS-Obergruppenführer Friedrich Jeckeln, the SS and Police Leader, met at Rear Headquarters Army Group South. There, they decided to exterminate the Jews of Kyiv, claiming that it was retaliation for the explosions. Also present were SS-Standartenführer Paul Blobel, commander of Sonderkommando 4a of Einsatzgruppe C, and his superior, SS-Brigadeführer Dr. Otto Rasch, commander of Einsatzgruppe C. The mass-murder was to be carried out by units under the command of Rasch and Blobel, who were ultimately responsible for many atrocities in Soviet Ukraine during the summer and autumn of 1941.

The implementation of the order was entrusted to Sonderkommando 4a of Einsatzgruppe C commanded by Blobel, under the general command of Friedrich Jeckeln. This unit consisted of Sicherheitsdienst (SD) and Sicherheitspolizei (SiPo), the third company of the Special Duties Waffen-SS battalion, and a platoon of the 9th Police Battalion. Sonderkommando 4a of Einsatzgruppe C and Police Battalion 45, commanded by Major Besser, conducted the massacre, supported by members of a Waffen-SS battalion. Contrary to the "myth of the clean Wehrmacht", the Sixth Army under the command of Field Marshal Walter von Reichenau worked together with the SS and SD to plan and execute the mass-murder of the Jews of Kyiv.

On 26 September 1941, the following order was posted:

On 29 and 30 September 1941, the Nazis and their collaborators murdered approximately 33,771 Jewish civilians at Babi Yar. The order to murder the Jews of Kyiv was given to Sonderkommando 4a of Einsatzgruppe C, consisting of SD and SiPo men, the third company of the Special Duties Waffen-SS battalion, and a platoon of the No. 9 police battalion. These units were reinforced by police battalions Nos. 45 and 303, by units of the Ukrainian auxiliary police, and supported by local collaborators. Sonderkommando 4a and the 45th Battalion of the German Order Police conducted the shootings. Servicemen of the 303rd Battalion of the German Order Police at this time guarded the outer perimeter of the execution site.

The commander of the Einsatzkommando reported two days later:

According to the testimony of a truck driver named Hofer, victims were ordered to undress and were beaten if they resisted:

The crowd was large enough that most of the victims could not have known what was happening until it was too late; by the time they heard the machine gun fire, there was no chance to escape. All were driven down a corridor of soldiers, in groups of ten, and then shot. A truck driver described the scene.

In the evening, the Germans undermined the wall of the ravine and buried the people under the thick layers of earth. According to the Einsatzgruppe's Operational Situation Report, 33,771 Jews from Kyiv and its suburbs were systematically shot dead by machine-gun fire at Babi Yar on 29 and 30 September 1941.  The money, valuables, underwear, and clothing of the murdered were turned over to the local ethnic Germans and to the Nazi administration of the city. Wounded victims were buried alive in the ravine along with the rest of the bodies.

Further massacres

In the months that followed, thousands more were seized and taken to Babi Yar where they were shot. It is estimated that more than 100,000 residents of Kyiv of all ethnic groups, mostly civilians, were murdered by the Nazis there during World War II. A concentration camp was also built in the area.

Mass executions at Babi Yar continued until the Nazis evacuated the city of Kyiv. On 10 January 1942 about 100 captured Soviet sailors were executed there after being forced to disinter and cremate the bodies of previous victims. In addition, Babi Yar became a place of execution of residents of five Gypsy camps. Patients of the Ivan Pavlov Psychiatric Hospital were gassed and then dumped into the ravine. Thousands of other Ukrainians were murdered at Babi Yar. Ukrainian poet and activist Olena Teliha and her husband, and renowned bandurist Mykhailo Teliha, were murdered there on 21 February 1942. Also murdered in 1941 was Ukrainian activist writer Ivan Rohach, his sister, and his staff.

Upon the Soviet liberation of Kyiv in 1943, Soviet officials led Western journalists to the site of the massacres and allowed them to interview survivors. Among the journalists were Bill Lawrence of The New York Times and Bill Downs of CBS. Downs described in a report to Newsweek what he had been told by one of the survivors, Efim Vilkis:

Number of people who were murdered 
Estimates of the total number of people who were murdered at Babi Yar during the Nazi occupation vary. At the Nuremberg trials in 1946, Soviet prosecutor Lev Smirnov claimed that approximately 100,000 corpses were lying in Babi Yar; he made this estimate using documents which were published by the Extraordinary State Commission which the Soviets set up in order to investigate Nazi crimes after the liberation of Kyiv in 1943.

In a recently published letter to the Israeli journalist, writer, and translator Shlomo Even-Shoshan which was dated 17 May 1965, Anatoly Kuznetsov commented on the Babi Yar atrocity:

Survivors
One of the most often-cited parts of Anatoly Kuznetsov's documentary novel Babi Yar is the testimony of Dina Pronicheva, an actress of the Kyiv Puppet Theatre, and a survivor. She was one of those ordered to march to the ravine, to be forced to undress and then be shot. Jumping before being shot and falling on other bodies, she played dead in a pile of corpses. She held perfectly still while the Nazis continued to shoot the wounded or gasping victims. Although the SS had covered the mass grave with earth, she eventually climbed through the soil and escaped. Since it was dark, she had to avoid the torches of the Nazis finishing off the remaining victims still alive, wounded, and gasping in the grave. She was one of the very few survivors of the massacre and later related her story to Kuznetsov. At least 29 survivors are known.

In 2006, Yad Vashem and other Jewish organisations started a project to identify and name the Babi Yar victims. However, so far, only 10% have been identified. Yad Vashem has recorded the names of around 3,000 Jews murdered at Babi Yar, as well as those of some 7,000 Jews from Kyiv who were murdered during the Holocaust.

Syrets concentration camp

In the course of the German occupation, the Syrets concentration camp was set up in Babi Yar. Interned communists, Soviet prisoners of war (POWs), and captured resistance members were murdered there, among others. On 18 February 1943, three Dynamo Kyiv football players (Trusevich, Klimenko, and Kuzmenko) who took part in the Match of Death with the German Luftwaffe team were also murdered in the camp.

Concealment of the crimes
Before the Nazis retreated from Kyiv ahead of the Soviet offensive of 1944, they were ordered by Wilhelm Koppe to conceal their atrocities in the East. Paul Blobel, who had been in control of the mass murders in Babi Yar two years earlier, supervised the Sonderaktion 1005 in eliminating its traces. The Aktion was carried out earlier in all extermination camps. The bodies were exhumed, burned and the ashes scattered over farmland in the vicinity. Several hundred prisoners of war from the Syrets concentration camp were forced to build funeral pyres out of Jewish gravestones and exhume the bodies for cremation.

Trials 
In the aftermath of the war, several SS commanders who had planned and supervised the massacre were arrested and put on trial. Paul Blobel, the overall commander of the SS unit responsible for the massacre, was sentenced to death by the Subsequent Nuremberg Trials in the Einsatzgruppen Trial. He was hanged on 7 June 1951 at Landsberg Prison. Otto Rasch was also indicted in the Einsatzgruppen Trial but his case was discontinued for health reasons, and he died in prison in 1948. Friedrich Jeckeln was convicted of war crimes by a Soviet military tribunal in the Riga Trial, sentenced to death, and hanged on 3 February 1946. Kurt Eberhard was arrested by US authorities but committed suicide while in custody in 1947.

In January 1946, 15 former members of the German police (including Paul Scheer) were tried in Kyiv over their roles in the massacre and other atrocities. Twelve of them were sentenced to death (Fritz Beckenhof, Karl Burckhardt, Georg Heinisch, Wilhelm Hellerforth, Hans Isenmann, Emil Jogschat, Emil Knoll, Willi Meier, Paul von Scheer, Eckart Hans von Tschammer und Osten, Georg Truckenbrod, and Oskar Walliser). The other three received prison sentences. Those condemned to death were publicly hanged in the town square of Kyiv on 29 January 1946. Erich Koch, who had been Reichskommissar of Ukraine at the time, was tried and sentenced to death by a Polish court for his atrocities in occupied Poland. However, he was never tried for his crimes in occupied Ukraine. His death sentence was commuted to life imprisonment, and he died in prison in 1986.

Two additional perpetrators were given prison sentences at the Nuremberg Trials. In 1967, 11 men were charged for participating in the massacre in a German court in Darmstadt. After a 14 month trial, seven were convicted and sentenced to prison terms ranging between four and fifteen years. In 1971, three more former German police officials were put on trial in Regensburg. The vast majority of the perpetrators were never tried for their roles in the massacre.

Remembrance

After the war, specifically Jewish commemoration efforts encountered serious difficulty because of the Soviet Union's policies. Yevgeny Yevtushenko's 1961 poem on Babi Yar begins "Nad Babim Yarom pamyatnikov nyet" ("Over Babi Yar there are no monuments"); it is also the first line of Shostakovich’s Symphony No. 13.

After the collapse of the Soviet Union, several memorials were erected on the site and elsewhere. The events also formed a part of literature. Babi Yar is located in Kyiv at the juncture of today's Kurenivka, Lukianivka and Syrets districts, between Kyrylivska, Melnykov, and Olena Teliha streets and St. Cyril's Monastery. After the Orange Revolution, President Viktor Yushchenko of Ukraine hosted a major commemoration of the 65th anniversary in 2006, attended by Presidents Moshe Katsav of Israel, Filip Vujanović of Montenegro, Stjepan Mesić of Croatia and Chief Rabbi of Tel Aviv Rabbi Yisrael Meir Lau. Rabbi Lau pointed out that if the world had reacted to the massacre of Babi Yar, perhaps the Holocaust might never have happened. Implying that this impunity emboldened Hitler, Lau speculated:

In 2006, a message was also delivered on behalf of Kofi Annan, Secretary-General of the United Nations, by his representative, Resident Coordinator Francis Martin O'Donnell, who added a Hebrew prayer  Shalom, from the Mourners' Kaddish.

Mudslide

In the spring of 1961, Babi Yar was the site of a massive mudslide. An earthen dam in the ravine was used to hold loam pulp which had been pumped from the local brick factories without sufficient drainage over the course of ten years. The dam collapsed after it was hit by a heavy rainstorm, resulting in a mudslide that swept away the low-lying Kurenivka neighborhood and several other areas. The death toll was estimated to be between 1,500 and 2,000 people.

2022 Russian bombing

On 1 March 2022, during Russia's invasion of Ukraine the site was struck by Russian forces while they were trying to destroy the nearby Kyiv TV Tower. The attack resulted in the death of at least five people.

See also
Antisemitism in Ukraine
Babi Yar in poetry
Symphony No. 13, called Babi Yar, by Dmitri Shostakovich
Symphony No.1 In Memoriam to the Martyrs of Babi Yar by Dmitri Klebanov (1945, audio)
Babi Yar Holocaust Memorial Center
Consequences of Nazism
Genocides in history
History of the Jews in Ukraine
The Holocaust in Ukraine
List of massacres in Ukraine
Mass graves in the Soviet Union
Nazi crimes against Soviet POWs
Operation Barbarossa
Reichskommissariat Ukraine
Ukrainian collaborationism with the Axis powers
Ukrainian cultural heritage during the 2022 Russian invasion
The Kindly Ones

Notes

References

Sources
A. Anatoli (Anatoly Kuznetsov), trans. David Floyd, (1970), Babi Yar: A Document in the Form of a Novel, Jonathan Cape Ltd. 
"Babi Yar in the mirror of science, or the map of Bermuda Triangle", an article in Dzerkalo Tyzhnia (the Mirror Weekly), July 2005, available online

Further reading
 Bibliography of the Soviet Union during World War II

External links

 The Invasion of the Soviet Union and the Beginnings of Mass Murder on the Yad Vashem website
 Marking 70 Years to Operation Barbarossa on the Yad Vashem website
 Babi Yar: Mass Murder  (history1900s.about.com)
 In-depth study on Babi Yar
 The Massacre at Babi Yar Near Kyiv (historyplace.com)
 Babi Yar (Jewish Virtual Library)
 Babi Yar: Killing Ravine of Kyiv Jewry – WWII  (zchor.org)
 Babi Yar (berdichev.org)
  History. Geography. Memory by Tatyana Yevstafyeva. 15 August 2002 (a reprint from newspaper "Jewish Observer")

 
1941 in the Soviet Union
Eastern Front (World War II)
Einsatzgruppen
1940s in Kyiv
Jewish Ukrainian history
Mass graves in Ukraine
Massacres in 1941
Massacres in the Soviet Union
Nazi war crimes in Ukraine
Reichskommissariat Ukraine
World War II massacres
World War II sites in Ukraine
World War II sites of Nazi Germany
1941 in Ukraine
Ravines
September 1941 events
Execution sites
1941 in Judaism
Massacres of Ukrainians during World War II
Holocaust locations in Ukraine
Holocaust massacres and pogroms in Ukraine